Valentina Marina Barron (born 9 February 1993) is an Australian actress, best known for her role as Flees in Stormworld.

Filmography

Awards/Nominations

References

External links

1993 births
Australian film actresses
Australian television actresses
Living people